Stacey Farber (born August 25, 1987) is a Canadian actress. She played Ellie Nash in seasons 2 through 8 of the television series Degrassi: The Next Generation. From 2010 to 2011, she starred in the CBC series 18 to Life. From 2014 to 2017, she played Sydney Katz on the Canadian medical drama Saving Hope. She is also known for her recurring roles on the Netflix drama series Virgin River and the CW superhero series Superman & Lois.

Early life and education
Farber was born in Toronto, Ontario, Canada to a Jewish family.

She graduated in 2005 from the all-girls private school Branksome Hall. She completed her first year of university at York University in Toronto in 2007, then transferred to The New School's Eugene Lang College in New York City, graduating in 2009.

Career
In her role as Ellie Nash on Degrassi: The Next Generation, Farber plays a troubled girl who has problems with depression and cutting, while dealing with an alcoholic mother. She started off as a recurring character in the show's second season, but was promoted to a regular role in the third season and continued until the end of season seven. For her work on Degrassi, she was nominated for Canada's top acting award, a Gemini Award, in the category 'Best Performance in a Youth Program or Series'.

In addition to playing Ellie in Degrassi, Farber also appeared in the 2001 Canadian short film Bagatelle. She played Young Kathryn in the 2002 crime film Narc, guest-starred as Lacy Sanders on an episode of the television drama Doc, and guest hosted the 2004–05 season finale of The N's Best Friend's Date. She also played Mary in the animated science fiction series Dark Oracle. She appeared as herself in Instant Star, and in 2006 had a mini-series on The N's The Click, Stacey's NYC 101. In addition to her screen work, she has appeared in various stage productions, including Love, Loss and What I Wore.

From 2010 to 2011, Farber starred in 18 to Life with Michael Seater. The CBC/CW series featured Seater marrying literal girl-next-door Farber at age 18, against both sets of parents' wishes. The pilot was actually filmed in 2008 in Montreal, with the further eleven episodes filmed in summer 2010. Critic Raju Mudhar wrote in the Toronto Star that the series had an "almost Juno-like quality". While disliking the series, he suggested the leads have "some chemistry and both are compelling, young actors to watch." The two were described as "getting along famously" in real life, having met only for the TV movie Degrassi Goes Hollywood. Farber's mother on the series was played by Angela Asher, who appeared with Farber before that in Made... The Movie. The series was nominated for a Gemini Award for best ensemble performance.

In October 2020, Farber was cast in the recurring role of Leslie Larr, described as a "hardened, world-worn dream killer", on the CW television series Superman & Lois. In December 2020, she was cast in the recurring role of Tara Anderson in the third season Netflix drama series Virgin River.

Filmography

References

External links
 
 

1987 births
21st-century Canadian actresses
Actresses from Toronto
Canadian child actresses
Canadian television actresses
Jewish Canadian actresses
Living people